Phragmacossia ariana is a species of moth of the family Cossidae. It is found in Uzbekistan, Tajikistan, Turkmenistan, Kyrgyzstan and Iran.

References

Moths described in 1899
Zeuzerinae